Aegean Speed Lines is a Greek ferry company that was operating high-speed ferry services between Piraeus and the Cyclades.

History
Aegean Speed Lines were formed in 2005 as a joint venture between Sea Containers and the Eugenides Group. Aegean Speed Lines were the first ferry company in Greece to use a European Union flag vessel on a domestic route following deregulation of ferry services in Greece. Sea Containers sold its share in 2006 leaving the Eugenides Group as the major shareholder.

Fleet
Aegean Speed Lines began operations using a single high speed catamaran Speedrunner I. Following two successful seasons a Fincantieri built monohull Speedrunner II joined the fleet in 2007. On 2008, the company sold Speedrunner I. In 2009 two more monohulls Speedrunner III and Speedruner IV joined the fleet. In 2015 and 2016 respectively, the company sold the Speedrunner II and the Speedrunner IV. In 2022 the company decided to stop the operations with her only remaining ship in her fleet Speedrunner III and Aegean Speed Lines sold her ship to Seajets. In 2023 Aegean Speed Lines bought the ship Rosella and renamed her Anemos.

Curent fleet:

Anemos (2023-present)

Former fleet:

Speedrunner I (2005-2008)           
Speedrunner II (2007–2015)
Speedrunner IV (2009–2016)
Speedrunner III (2009–2022)

Routes

 Piraeus–Serifos–Sifnos–Milos (Speedrunner III)

Awards
In 2009 Aegean Speed Lines was awarded by "Lloyd's List Greek Shipping Awards" as "The Best Passenger Line of the Year 2009".

References

Ferry companies of Greece
Transport companies established in 2005
Companies based in Athens
Greek companies established in 2005